Bloomfield, New Jersey was incorporated on March 23, 1812. It operates under a Special Charter granted under an Act of the New Jersey Legislature. The township is governed by a mayor and a six-member Township Council. The mayor and three councilmembers are elected at-large, and one member from each of three wards, with all positions chosen on a partisan basis as part of the November general election. Councilmembers are elected to three-year terms of office on a staggered basis, with the three at-large seats (and the mayoral seat) up for election together and the three ward seats coming up for election two years later. Bloomfield's charter, retains most of the characteristics of the Town form, with additional powers delegated to an administrator. The mayors are:

Mayors

Michael J. Venezia, 2014 to December 31, 2019. He is a Democrat.
Raymond J. McCarthy, 2007 to 2010.
John I. Crecco, circa 1998.
John W. Kinder, 1971–1985.
Donald H. Scott, 1950 to 1955.
Charles H. Demarest, 1925 to 1932.
Frederic R. Pilch, 1920 to 1924.
Frederick Sadler, 1916 to 1919.
William Hauser (mayor), 1911 to 1912.
William P. Sutphen, 1907 to 1910.
George Fisher (mayor), 1905 to 1906.

References

Bloomfield